Actinostolidae is a family of sea anemones in the order Actiniaria. Members of this family are deep sea species, with some occurring at hydrothermal vents.

Genera
The following genera are recognised by the World Register of Marine Species:

Actinoloba de Blainville, 1830
Actinostola Verrill, 1883
Antholoba Hertwig, 1882
Anthosactis Danielssen, 1890
Antiparactis Verrill, 1899
Bathydactylus Carlgren, 1928
Cnidanthus Carlgren, 1927
Glandulactis Riemann-Zürneck, 1978
Hadalanthus Carlgren, 1956
Hormosoma Stephenson, 1918
Isoparactis Stephenson, 1920
Ophiodiscus Hertwig, 1882
Paranthus Andres, 1883
Parasicyonis Carlgren, 1921
Pseudoparactis Stephenson, 1920
Pycnanthus McMurrich, 1893
Sicyonis Hertwig, 1882
Stomphia (Gosse, 1859)
Synsicyonis Carlgren, 1921
Tealidium Hertwig, 1882

See also
Anthosactis pearseae

References

 
Taxa named by Oskar Carlgren
Actinostoloidea
Cnidarian families